Kumaahran a/l Sathasivam (born 3 July 1996) is a Malaysian footballer who plays as a forward for Petaling Jaya City in the Malaysia Super League.

Club career 
Kumaahran began his senior career playing in Singapore, representing Harimau Muda in the 2015 S.League.

In 2016, he made a move to the Malaysian Super League by signing for the newly promoted Penang FA.

International career 
In August 2015, Kumaahran was selected by Dollah Salleh, the national head coach, to be part of the twenty-two men squad for the matches against Bangladesh, the UAE and Saudi Arabia. At a young age of 19, he earned his first international cap in the match against Bangladesh. In that match, he came on as a substitute for Nor Farhan Muhammad in the 73rd minute.

International goals

Malaysia Under-23

Honours

Club
Johor Darul Ta'zim II F.C.
 Malaysia Challenge Cup(1): 2019

International
Malaysia U-23
 Bangabandhu Cup
  Winner (1): 2015
Southeast Asian Games
 Silver Medal: 2017

References

External links 
 
 S.League Official Website
 Harimau Muda Stun Champions Warriors

Living people
Malaysian footballers
Malaysia international footballers
Penang F.C. players
People from Penang
Malaysian people of Tamil descent
Malaysian sportspeople of Indian descent
Malaysia Super League players
Singapore Premier League players
Association football forwards
Southeast Asian Games silver medalists for Malaysia
Southeast Asian Games medalists in football
1996 births
Competitors at the 2017 Southeast Asian Games
21st-century Malaysian people